ʿAbd Shams ibn ʿAbd Manāf was a prominent member of the Quraysh tribe of Mecca in modern-day Saudi Arabia. The Banu Abd Shams sub-clan of the Quraish tribe and their descendants take its name from him.

Lineage
Abd Shams was the oldest son of Abd Manaf ibn Qusai. His younger brothers were Muttalib, Nawfal and Hashim, after whom the Banu Hashim clan was named.

The Banu Umayya clan was named after Umayya ibn Abd Shams, Abd Shams' biological son (more probable) or adopted son, according to different versions.

Notable relatives and descendants

References

464 births
5th-century Arabs
Year of death unknown
Ancient Arabs
Quraysh